Edward Matthew Curran (May 10, 1903 – January 10, 1988) was a United States district judge of the United States District Court for the District of Columbia.

Education and career

Born in Bangor, Maine, Curran received a Bachelor of Laws from the Columbus School of Law at the Catholic University of America in 1927 and an Artium Baccalaureus degree from the University of Maine in 1928. He was in private practice in Washington, D.C. from 1928 to 1934, and was an assistant corporation counsel for the District of Columbia from 1934 to 1936. He was a Judge of the District of Columbia Police Court from 1936 to 1940, and then served as the United States Attorney for the District of Columbia from 1940 to 1946.

Federal judicial service

Curran received a recess appointment from President Harry S. Truman on October 16, 1946, to an Associate Justice seat on the District Court of the United States for the District of Columbia (Judge of the United States District Court for the District of Columbia after June 25, 1948) vacated by Judge Daniel William O`Donoghue. He was nominated to the same position by President Truman on January 8, 1947. He was confirmed by the United States Senate on February 3, 1947, and received his commission on February 5, 1947. He served as Chief Judge from 1966 to 1971. He was a member of the Judicial Conference of the United States from 1968 to 1971. He assumed senior status on April 2, 1971. His service terminated on January 10, 1988, due to his death.

Notable case

Curran presided over the trial of Mildred Gillars (aka Axis Sally) for treason in 1949. Gillars was coincidentally also born in Maine (Portland).

References

Sources
 

1903 births
1988 deaths
Columbus School of Law alumni
University of Maine alumni
Judges of the United States District Court for the District of Columbia
United States district court judges appointed by Harry S. Truman
20th-century American judges
People from Bangor, Maine
United States Attorneys for the District of Columbia
20th-century American lawyers